Veden or Weden may refer to
Veden Manor in Norway
Veden varaan, a pop-rock album from the Finnish group PMMP
Sven Wedén (1913–1976), Swedish politician

See also
 List of hundreds of Sweden